Charles Hempel may refer to:

 Charles Frederick Hempel (1811–1867), organist and composer
 Charles Julius Hempel (1811–1879), German-born translator and homeopathic physician
 Charles William Hempel (1777–1855), English organist